Hyderabad–Indore Expressway is an approved upcoming expressway in India. It will connect Hyderabad, the capital of Telangana to Indore in Madhya Pradesh.

Route 
The expressway will pass through the states of Telangana, Maharashtra and Madhya Pradesh. It will provide connectivity to the following towns, cities and tourist attractions.

Telangana 

 Hyderabad
 Sangareddy
 Jogipet

Maharashtra 

 Deglur
 Nanded
 Akola

Madhya Pradesh 
borgaon bujurg 
 Omkareshwar
 Indore

Status 

 Aug 13, 2020 - Proposed
 Dec 21, 2020 - Foundation Stone laid
 Apr 30, 2022 - Hyderabad – Indore Economic Corridor: 96 Km Long Telangana Section Inaugurated By Nitin Gadkari

References 

Expressways in India
Transport in Indore
Transport in Hyderabad, India